Harnoncourt-Unverzagt is the name of an old Austrian noble family, which came to Austria from the Duchy of Lorraine, but originated from Luxembourg.

History 
Counts d'Harnoncourt intermarried with Unverzagt family in the 18th century when Joseph Ludwig Matthias de la Fontaine, Count of Harnoncourt (1736–1816) married Countess Maria Leopoldine Unverzagt (1754–1835), who was the last of her line. Their son Count Herbert Ludwig de la Fontaigne, Count of Harnoncourt (1789–1846), took over her coat of arms in 1839 and called himself Graf von Harnoncourt-Unverzagt. All members of the family have descended from him and his wife, Countess Sophie von Haugwitz (1798–1859).

Notable members 
 Alice d'Harnoncourt (1930–2022), Austrian violinist, wife of Nikolaus
 Anne d'Harnoncourt (1943–2008), American museum director, historian of modern art and daughter of Rene
 Franz d'Harnoncourt (born 1937), Austrian physician and academic teacher, brother of Nikolaus
 Karl d'Harnoncourt (born 1934), Austrian jurist, brother of Nikolaus
 Ladislaja d'Harnoncourt (1899–1997), mother of Nikolaus, Philipp, Franz and Karl
 Nikolaus d'Harnoncourt (1929–2016), Austrian conductor, son of Ladislaja
 Philipp d'Harnoncourt (1931–2020), Austrian theologian, brother of Nikolaus
 Rene d'Harnoncourt (1901–1968), Austrian-American museum director

References